Kozlov's pygmy jerboa (Salpingotus kozlovi) is a species of rodent in the family Dipodidae. It is found in northwestern China and southern and eastern Mongolia. Its natural habitat is temperate desert.

Description
The fur is silky, the upper parts are sandy-grey with the bases of the hairs yellowish-grey, the flanks are rather paler and the underparts white or yellowish. The hind feet have three toes and dense pads of long hair on the soles. The tail is scantily clad with long hairs and has a tufted, dark-coloured tip.

Distribution and habitat

Kozlov's pygmy jerboa is native to southern and eastern Mongolia, and northwestern China, in the provinces of Gansu, Nei Mongol, Ningxia, Shaanxi, Xinjiang. Its natural habitat is sandy desert and semi-desert, often with scrubby saxaul (Haloxylon ammodendron) and tamarix.

Ecology
The ecology of Kozlov's pygmy jerboa is not well known. It lives in a burrow and is mainly nocturnal, emerging at dusk to feed on seeds, green plant matter, spiders and insects. Breeding takes place in April and May and the litter size averages three to five young.

Status
Kozlov's pygmy jerboa has a wide range and is a common species in suitable habitat. The population trend is not known but it is presumed to have a large total population and is present in several protected areas. No specific threats to this jerboa have been identified, and the International Union for Conservation of Nature has assessed its conservation status as being of "least concern".

References

Salpingotus
Mammals described in 1922
Mammals of China
Taxonomy articles created by Polbot